DENK (Dutch for "think" and Turkish for "equal" or "balanced") is a political party in the Netherlands, founded on a minority rights platform. It is legally registered as  "Politieke Beweging Denk" (Political Movement Denk).

The party was founded by Tunahan Kuzu and Selçuk Öztürk, two Turkish Dutch members of the House of Representatives, after leaving the Labour Party on 13 November 2014. Upon winning three seats at the 2017 election, DENK became the first migrant-founded party to gain seats in the Dutch national parliament.

Although the party has been colloquially described as a "Muslim political party", DENK "does not promote Muslim candidates as do most similar political parties in Europe". Indeed, during DENK's second State elections in 2021, Stephan van Baarle, an agnostic, also became a DENK member of the House of Representatives. The party BIJ1 was created by Sylvana Simons when she left DENK in 2016, and the two parties overlap substantially on minority rights issues but are divergent on cultural liberal aspects.

History
DENK was founded by Tunahan Kuzu and Selçuk Öztürk after leaving the Labour Party on 13 November 2014. Their resignations were prompted by proposals by Deputy Prime Minister and party leader Lodewijk Asscher that a number of Turkish Islamist organisations be monitored for interfering with the integration of Dutch citizens of Muslim origin. This came after an internal party debate sparked by a report incorrectly stating that 90% of young Turkish Dutch supported ISIS. On 9 February 2015, they gave their parliamentary group the name DENK and published a political manifesto for the establishment of a movement for migrants and a "tolerant and solidary society" which, among other things, calls for a "racism registry".

The results from the 2017 election ensured that Kuzu and Öztürk would remain in parliament together with new arrival Farid Azarkan, who is the current party leader.

Manifesto
The movement drew up a political manifesto in February 2015, from which the political party DENK emerged in November 2016.

The DENK programme argues for the following five points:
a tolerant society in which we accept each other.
a caring society in which we look out for each other.
a learning society in which we utilize everyone's talents.
a sustainable society where we have to think about our environment.
a just society, promoting international justice.

The movement wants to establish a monument in memory of labour, and they want knowledge of migration history as a key target in education. They propose that the term "integration" should be replaced by the word "acceptance". The movement would abolish the term "immigrant". It notes that people with a non-western background are less likely to find a job or internship and often have negative experiences with law enforcement. The manifesto states that racism in the Netherlands is structural and institutional in nature and therefore wants a so-called "racism registry" to be set up, in which manifestations of racism are registered.

The movement proposes that in education, diversity in the classroom is commensurate with the diversity of the class (including the teacher). The movement has a policy that in every school in the Netherlands, both in primary and secondary education, study of Chinese, Arabic, and Turkish must be introduced as optional subjects. According to the movement, education in these languages will be useful for the country's economy and international relations. According to the manifesto, imams should not only be appointed to mosques, but also in health care, prisons and the armed forces.

DENK's view is that the United Nations and its Security Council need fundamental reform and that the European Union should pursue an independent foreign policy. The movement wants to tackle Islamic extremism by tackling its root causes, which, according to the party, consist of hopelessness, social exclusion, and injustice. On the Israeli–Palestinian conflict, the party advocates that Europe strengthen the international position of Palestine and that the Netherlands recognises the State of Palestine.

The party carries the program advanced by the International Institute for Scientific Research, based in The Hague, with the purpose of decolonization. Among its policies, DENK seeks to: establish a "racism register" to track and condemn the use of hate speech against religion; build a Dutch slavery museum; abolish the black character Zwarte Piet ("Black Pete"); and ban the use of the Dutch word "Allochtoon" which it considers as derogatory towards ethnic minorities in the Netherlands.

Electorate 
The party mainly attracts support from ethnic minorities in the Netherlands, especially from the Turkish and Moroccan population. Correspondingly the support for DENK is the strongest in cities and towns with a significant migrant population, especially in the larger cities such as Amsterdam and Rotterdam. In these cities the support for the party concentrates in the majority-minority districts, such as Nieuw-West in Amsterdam or Kanaleneiland in Utrecht, gaining between 30 and 40% of the votes in those districts.

Controversy

Support for the AKP 

The two leaders and founders of the party have been criticised for being "closely linked to the AKP" of Turkish leader Recep Tayyip Erdoğan, and "do not criticize Erdogan and Turkish government policies". Some critics in the Dutch media have called the party the "long arm of Erdoğan" for its perceived support of the party line of the Turkish government and the ruling AK Party. The party was the sole party in the Netherlands that did not call for the release of a Turkish-Dutch blogger who was arrested for a tweet about Erdoğan. The party has also been heavily criticised for refusing to distance itself from the purges in Turkey since 2016. However, as DENK's leader, Kuzu distanced himself from comments of Erdoğan in which the Turkish president called Dutch authorities "Nazi remnants and fascists", labelling those comments "incorrect" and "very troublesome".

The Diyanet, a Turkish governmental unit, has allowed DENK to promote itself in Diyanet-controlled Dutch mosques. There are 146 such mosques as of 2018.

The party's program for the 2017 general election, in the context of the Armenian genocide, mourns both the Turkish and the Armenian sides, while calling for an "independent international investigation". DENK claims that there is no consensus regarding the scale and cause of the tragedy, and calls for "reason and unification". Within that framework, the party does not use the term genocide. DENK was the sole party which voted against a bill recognising the Armenian Genocide.

Targeting Turkish Dutch politicians
In March 2020, DENK was condemned by fellow members of the House of Representatives for releasing videos of MPs of Turkish descent from other parties, in which they are portrayed, for example, as "traitors" to the Turkish-Dutch community.

Electoral results

House of Representatives

European Parliament

Provincial

See also
List of political parties in the Netherlands
Nuance Party

References

External links
  

2015 establishments in the Netherlands
Anti-racism in the Netherlands
Anti-Zionism in the Netherlands
DENK politicians
Identity politics
Middle Eastern diaspora in the Netherlands
Minority rights
Multiculturalism in Europe
Organisations based in Rotterdam
Political parties established in 2015
Political parties of minorities
Social democratic parties in the Netherlands
Turkish diaspora in Europe